Tom Warner (February 6, 1948 – January 11, 2019) was an American politician. He was born in Rochester, New York.

Warner previously served as a Representative in the House of Representatives of the U.S. state of Florida. He lived in Stuart, Florida, with his family. He died of cancer in 2019 at the age of 70.

Education
Warner received his bachelor's degree in business administration from the University of Florida in 1970, followed by a juris doctor in 1973.

References

External links
Official Website of Tom Warner

Warrington College of Business alumni
Republican Party members of the Florida House of Representatives
Solicitors General of Florida
1948 births
2019 deaths
Fredric G. Levin College of Law alumni